The Embalmer is a 1965 Italian giallo film directed by Dino Tavella, and starring Gino Marturano, Alcide Gazzotto, and Alba Brotto. 
Dino Tavella had a very short career in the Italian film industry, writing and directing only two films, The Embalmer and Una Sporca Guerra (A Dirty War).

Plot

A serial killer dressed in scuba gear and a wet suit is on the loose in the canals of Venice. The skull-faced murderer kills women by drowning them in the canals and taking their bodies back to his underwater lair (a submerged monastery) where he embalms them to preserve their beauty. The lunatic keeps their perfectly preserved bodies in a row of glass display cases in his lair. A handsome young reporter is assigned to cover a group of visiting college girls on a class trip to Venice and when one of them disappears, he becomes involved in trying to find her. He falls in love with one of the girls, not realizing that the Embalmer has her marked as his next victim. The reporter manages to enter the killer's underwater cave (a submerged monastery) and chases the killer up onto the streets of Venice. The police shoot the lunatic dead as he is strangling the hero in a maniacal grip.

Cast

Production
The Embalmer was described by film critic and histroian Roberto Curti as being regionally produced away from Rome, with a cast of unknowns. Curti described the film as a giallo, while showing diverse influences such as borrowing elements from fumetti neri comics and dabbling into gothic horror. Critic Adrian Luther Smith called the film an "Edgar Wallace-inspired horror giallo"

Release
The Embalmer was first released in 1965. It has very little circulation theatrically in Italy. On the film's release in the United States, it was titled The Embalmer. It played in Atlanta, Georgia on May 2, 1966. It played on double bills in the United States with The She Beast.

The Embalmer was released on DVD by Alpha Video on August 31, 2004. Alpha Video would later re-release the film on August 17, 2010 in its 12-disk "Pure Terror: 50 Movies Pack". In 2005 the film was released by Vintage Home Entertainment and Image Entertainment on July 12, and September 13, respectively. Mill Creek Entertainment released the film a total of four separate times. Mill Creek first released it as a part of two separate multi-feature movie packs in July and October 2007. The following year they would re-release the film as a part of its 24-disk "Tales of Horror: 100 Movie Pack", and lastly on August 28, 2009, as a part of yet another multi-film collection.

Reception

From retrospective reviews, TV Guide gave the film 0 out of 5 stars, calling it "stupid". Curti stated that the films "mise-en-scene is amateurish and lacks thrills, despite some potentially interesting moments."

Adrian Luther Smith called the film creepy but still a "run-of-the-submerged-monastery affair", adding "The filmmakers obviously received a great deal of assistance from the Venice tourist department because the movie is jam-packed with sly plugs for a gorgeous city which surely needs no promotion."

References

Bibliography

External links
 
 
 
 

1965 films
Giallo films
1960s serial killer films
Films set in Venice
Italian black-and-white films
1960s Italian-language films
1965 horror films
Italian horror films
1960s Italian films